The Mali Graben is a creek and a natural branch of the Gradaščica River in southwest Ljubljana. It flows south of and parallel to the Gradaščica and is the largest affluent of the river Ljubljanica. It is also known as Stržen (literally, 'thalweg') and Mala voda ('Little Creek').

The creek is a natural channel. It splits from the Gradaščica not far from Bokalce Castle, then flows across the southern part of the Murgle residential district and joins the Ljubljanica from the left side near the Gruber Canal. Most water from the Gradaščica is diverted into the Mali Graben, helping alleviate flooding of the Trnovo District of Ljubljana.

References

External links
A map. Provided by Geopedia.

Rivers of Ljubljana
Gradaščica